Nepenthe  is a fictional medicine for sorrow – a "drug of forgetfulness" mentioned in ancient Greek literature and Greek mythology, depicted as originating in Egypt.

The carnivorous plant genus Nepenthes is named after the drug nepenthe.

In the Odyssey
The word  first appears in the fourth book of Homer's Odyssey:

Analysis
Figuratively, nepenthe means "that which chases away sorrow". "grief, sorrow, or mourning". 

In the Odyssey, νηπενθές φάρμακον :   (i.e. an anti-sorrow drug) is a magical potion given to Helen by Polydamna, the wife of the noble Egyptian Thon; it quells all sorrows with forgetfulness. 

Pliny the Elder and Dioscorides believed nepenthe to be the medicinal herb borage. 

In modern times prior to the 20th century it was accepted that Indian hemp was the nepenthe. 

Quoting the passage cited above in his 2015 novel  (Compass), French writer  identifies nepenthe with opium. Likewise, in Forbidden Drugs, Philip Robson writes: "What else could Helen of Troy’s nepenthe have been but opium?" The problem with identifying the drug as opium, however, is that by the time of Homer, it already had a long history of use by the Greeks, whereas nepenthe was something unknown to them.

References

Odyssey
Mythological medicines and drugs